Klas Stefan Roos (born 3 February 1970) is a Swedish actor and screen writer. Roos finished NAMA in Stockholm 1993. He is married to the actress Elisabet Carlsson and together they have a daughter.

Filmography

 2007 - Mimmi och Mojje
 2005 - Jonson och Pipen
 2003 - Hem till Midgård
 1997 - Beck – Lockpojken
 1996 - Bröderna Fluff

External links

1970 births
Swedish male actors
Living people
Swedish screenwriters
Swedish male screenwriters